Emile George Perrot (November 11, 1872 – February 7, 1954) was an architect and engineer from Philadelphia, Pennsylvania, United States.

Career

Perrot was born in Philadelphia in 1872. He graduated from the University of Pennsylvania.

In 1902, Perrot formed a partnership with Walter Francis Ballinger, a firm known as Ballinger & Perrot. When Ballinger bought out Perrot's share in 1920, the firm became known as Ballinger Company, and Perott opened his own office.

Perrot was a member of the American Institute of Architects and the American Society of Civil Engineers.

Perrot died on February 7, 1954.

Principal Architectural Works

 Union Park Gardens, Wilmington, Delaware (completed in 1918).
 St. Vincent's School, Church Street, Plymouth, Pennsylvania (built in 1922).
 Our Lady of Mercy Academy, Syosset, New York (completed in 1928).
 White-Gravenor Hall, Georgetown University, Washington, D.C. (completed in 1933).

Gallery

External links

References

Architects from Pennsylvania
20th-century American architects